Max McAlary (born 20 December 1929) is an Australian wrestler. He competed in the men's freestyle flyweight at the 1964 Summer Olympics.

References

External links
 

1929 births
Living people
Australian male sport wrestlers
Olympic wrestlers of Australia
Wrestlers at the 1964 Summer Olympics
Place of birth missing (living people)